Chang Tien-chin (born 8 March 1954) is a Taiwanese politician. He was the deputy minister of the Mainland Affairs Council.

Education and legal career
Chang obtained his bachelor's and master's degrees in law from National Taiwan University in 1976 and 1978, respectively, and master's degree in admiralty law and doctoral degree in law from Tulane University in the United States in 1982 and 1984, respectively. He became a lawyer for the Democratic Progressive Party.

Political career
Chang took office as deputy minister of the Mainland Affairs Council on 20 May 2016, with the Tsai Ing-wen presidential administration. In September 2016, Chang began his duties as vice chairman of the  Straits Exchange Foundation. He was replaced in September.

Chang was subsequently named vice chairman of the Transitional Justice Commission in March 2018, and left his position at the Mainland Affairs Council. Chang was formally sworn into office in July 2018, a month after the Transitional Justice Commission had started meeting. In September 2018, a whistleblower made public a recording in which Chang compared the Transitional Justice Commission to the infamous Ming dynasty organization Eastern Depot which stifled dissent. In the recording, he suggested that the Tsai Ing-wen presidential administration should use dirty tricks to defeat Kuomintang mayoral candidate Hou You-yi's bid. Subsequently, Chang resigned from his position as deputy chairman of the commission On 1 October 2019, the Control Yuan voted unanimously for Chang's impeachment.

References

1954 births
Living people
Political office-holders in the Republic of China on Taiwan
Politicians of the Republic of China on Taiwan from Chiayi County